Hypoaspis is a genus of mites in the family Laelapidae.

Description 
Hypoaspis is superficially similar to related genera such as Coleolaelaps, Mumulaelaps and Promacrolaelaps. It can be distinguished by: a rounded and oval dorsal shield without lateral incisions, and with 35–40 pairs of setae including one or more pairs of Zx setae; opisthonotal seta Z4 being very long and wavy; the sternal shield having a distinct anterior margin; h3 being longest out of the hypostomal setae; the first leg pair being longer than the third leg pair; the second and third femurs on each side with macrosetae present; the tarsus of the second leg pair with thick subterminal spines; and the post-anal seta shorter than or equal in length to the para-anal setae.

This genus of mites is often associated with beetles, especially scarab beetles, but the nature of this association is uncertain. Hypoaspis may be parasites of eggs and larvae, or they may be commensals that feed on beetle exudates or on other small invertebrates associated with beetles.

Biological control 
The genus once contained the species H. aculeifer and H. miles, which are used for biological pest control of sciarid and phorid fly larvae in mushrooms. However, these species have since been moved to genera Gaeolaelaps and Stratiolaelaps, respectively.

Species
The composition of Hypoaspis is uncertain. It has historically been a large genus with multiple subgenera. It was later reduced to only the members of subgenus Hypoaspis (Hypoaspis) or Hypoaspis sensu stricto. There are currently 36 species.

Below is a list of species currently and formerly included in Hypoaspis:

 Hypoaspis aciphila Karg, 1987
 Hypoaspis acme Womersley, 1955
 Hypoaspis aculeifer (G. Canestrini, 1884)
 Hypoaspis aculeiferoides Teng, 1982
 Hypoaspis acutiscutus (Teng, 1982)
 Hypoaspis analis Karg, 1982
 Hypoaspis angulatus (Berlese, 1916)
 Hypoaspis angusta Karg, 1965
 Hypoaspis anserina Karg, 1981
 Hypoaspis ardoris Karg, 1993
 Hypoaspis armstrongi (Womersley, 1956)
 Hypoaspis astronomica (C.L. Koch, 1839)
 Hypoaspis australis Hull, 1923
 Hypoaspis austriacus (Sellnick, 1935)
 Hypoaspis aviator (Berlese, 1920))
 Hypoaspis baichengensis Ma, 2000
 Hypoaspis barbarae Strong, 1995
 Hypoaspis barbatula Karg, 1989
 Hypoaspis berlesei Bernhard, 1973
 Hypoaspis bipennata Karg, 2003
 Hypoaspis bispinosa Karg, 1997
 Hypoaspis blattae Strong & Halliday, 1994
 Hypoaspis brevidentis Karg, 1978
 Hypoaspis brevipedestra Karg, 1985
 Hypoaspis brevipellis Karg, 1979
 Hypoaspis brevistilis Karg, 1978
 Hypoaspis campestris (Berlese, 1887)
 Hypoaspis cassoidea Karg, 1981
 Hypoaspis cerata Karg, 1982
 Hypoaspis changlingensis Ma, 2000
 Hypoaspis chelaris Teng, Zhang & Cui, 1992
 Hypoaspis chianensis Gu, 1990
 Hypoaspis chini (Bai & Gu, 1993)
 Hypoaspis chongqingensis Ma, Zhang & Li, 2003
 Hypoaspis ciconia Karg, 1979
 Hypoaspis claviger (Berlese, 1883)
 Hypoaspis collina Huhta & Karg, 2010
 Hypoaspis comelicensis (Lombardini, 1962)
 Hypoaspis concinna Teng, 1982
 Hypoaspis corpolongus (Rosario, 1981)
 Hypoaspis corpulentus (Berlese, 1920)
 Hypoaspis cubaensis Karg, 1981
 Hypoaspis cuneifer Michael, 1891
 Hypoaspis cursoria Karg, 1988
 Hypoaspis dailingensis Ma & Yin, 1998
 Hypoaspis debilis Ma, 1996
 Hypoaspis decellei van-Driel, Loots & Marais, 1977
 Hypoaspis decemsetae Karg, 1994
 Hypoaspis deinos Zeman, 1982
 Hypoaspis dendrophilus (Davydova, 1977)
 Hypoaspis dentipilosa Karg, 1978
 Hypoaspis digitalis (Teng, 1981)
 Hypoaspis disjuncta Hunter & Yeh, 1969
 Hypoaspis disparatus (Banks, 1916)
 Hypoaspis diversa Karg, 1994
 Hypoaspis elegans Joharchi, Ostovan & Babaeian, 2014
 Hypoaspis elegantula (Berlese, 1903)
 Hypoaspis elimata Berlese, 1920
 Hypoaspis equitans (Michael, 1891)
 Hypoaspis euarmata Karg, 1996
 Hypoaspis eucapillata Karg, 2003
 Hypoaspis eugenitalis Karg, 1978
 Hypoaspis eupatori (Womersley, 1956)
 Hypoaspis eupraedonis Karg, 1989
 Hypoaspis eupygidialis Karg, 2003
 Hypoaspis euventricosa Karg, 1995
 Hypoaspis evansi Arutunian, 1993
 Hypoaspis expolita (Berlese, 1904)
 Hypoaspis exquisita Karg, 1989
 Hypoaspis femorata Karg, 1978
 Hypoaspis finitima (Berlese, 1903))
 Hypoaspis fishtowni Ruf & Koehler, 1993
 Hypoaspis formationis Karg, 1989
 Hypoaspis furcatoides Karg, 1981
 Hypoaspis glabra Karg, 1978
 Hypoaspis gladii Karg, 1993
 Hypoaspis gleba Karg, 1979
 Hypoaspis guttaforma Karg, 1989
 Hypoaspis guttulata Karg, 1978
 Hypoaspis haiyuanensis Bai, Chen & Gu, 1994
 Hypoaspis hefeiensis Xu & Liang, 1996
 Hypoaspis hermaphroditoides Oudemans, 1902
 Hypoaspis heteronychus (Womersley, 1956)
 Hypoaspis hoffmannae Smiley, Baker & Delfinado-Baker, 1996
 Hypoaspis hunanensis Ma & Zheng, 2000
 Hypoaspis inarmata Karg, 1997
 Hypoaspis inepilis Banks, 1916
 Hypoaspis integer (Berlese, 1911)
 Hypoaspis inversus (Banks, 1916)
 Hypoaspis isodentis Karg, 1989
 Hypoaspis isotricha (Kolenati, 1858)
 Hypoaspis jambar Ishikawa, 1985
 Hypoaspis krameri (G. Canestrini & R. Canestrini, 1881)
 Hypoaspis krantzi Arutunian, 1993
 Hypoaspis larvicolus Joharchi & Halliday, 2011
 Hypoaspis latanalis Karg, 2000
 Hypoaspis latodentis Karg, 1993
 Hypoaspis lepoauris Karg, 1981
 Hypoaspis lepta Oudemans, 1902
 Hypoaspis leptolingua Karg, 1994
 Hypoaspis liae (Bai & Gu, 1993)
 Hypoaspis lingua Karg, 1987
 Hypoaspis liui (Samsinak, 1962)
 Hypoaspis loksai Karg, 2000
 Hypoaspis longanalis Karg, 2003
 Hypoaspis longchuanensis Gu & Duan, 1991
 Hypoaspis longichaetus Ma, 1996
 Hypoaspis longicostalis Karg, 1978
 Hypoaspis longodigiti Karg, 1979
 Hypoaspis longogenitalis Karg, 1978
 Hypoaspis louisensis Loots, 1980
 Hypoaspis lusisi Lapina, 1976
 Hypoaspis luteus (Oudemans, 1917)
 Hypoaspis lyratus (Banks, 1916)
 Hypoaspis mabilogus (Rosario, 1981)
 Hypoaspis macra Karg, 1978
 Hypoaspis macrochaeta Karg, 1988
 Hypoaspis magkadikitus (Rosario, 1981)
 Hypoaspis magnisetae Ma, 1988
 Hypoaspis mahuncai Karg, 1988
 Hypoaspis malakutsilyus (Rosario, 1981)
 Hypoaspis mandibularis (Ewing, 1909)
 Hypoaspis maryamae Joharchi & Halliday, 2011
 Hypoaspis masculina Karg, 1988
 Hypoaspis matinikus (Rosario, 1981)
 Hypoaspis mediocuspis (Karg, 1981)
 Hypoaspis melolonthae Joharchi & Halliday, 2011
 Hypoaspis metapodalii Karg, 1978
 Hypoaspis michaeli Huhta & Karg, 2010
 Hypoaspis miles (Berlese, 1892)
 Hypoaspis militiformis Oudemans, 1902
 Hypoaspis millipedus (Rosario, 1981)
 Hypoaspis minusculus Banks, 1916
 Hypoaspis mohrii Ishikawa, 1982
 Hypoaspis moseri Hunter & Glover, 1968
 Hypoaspis mumai Hunter & Glover, 1968
 Hypoaspis nana (Mégnin, 1876)
 Hypoaspis nasoseta Karg, 1981
 Hypoaspis neimongolianus Ma-Liming & Wang-Shenron, 1998
 Hypoaspis neocuneifer Evans & Till, 1966
 Hypoaspis ningxiaensis (Bai & Gu, 1993)
 Hypoaspis nolli Karg, 1962
 Hypoaspis oblongus (Halbert, 1915)
 Hypoaspis onustus (Berlese, 1904)
 Hypoaspis oreithyiae (Walter & Oliver, 1989)
 Hypoaspis orientalis Bei & Yin, 2000
 Hypoaspis ornatus (Berlese, 1903)
 Hypoaspis ovatus Ma, Ning & You-Wen, 2003
 Hypoaspis ovisuga (Berlese, 1903)
 Hypoaspis pahabaeus (Rosario, 1981)
 Hypoaspis pannicula Karg, 1981
 Hypoaspis paraculeifer (Rosario, 1981)
 Hypoaspis paracuneifer Gu & Bai, 1992
 Hypoaspis passalus (Rosario, 1981)
 Hypoaspis paucidentis Karg, 1989
 Hypoaspis pellucida Berlese, 1904
 Hypoaspis penicillata Karg, 1979
 Hypoaspis picketti Hunter & Glover, 1968
 Hypoaspis pinnae Karg, 1987
 Hypoaspis postreticulatus Xu & Liang, 1996
 Hypoaspis praesternalis Willmann, 1949
 Hypoaspis praesternaloides Ma & Yin, 1998
 Hypoaspis praetarsalis Karg, 1978
 Hypoaspis pratensis Huhta & Karg, 2010
 Hypoaspis pugiocuspis Karg, 1981
 Hypoaspis pugni Karg, 1979
 Hypoaspis punyalus (Rosario, 1981)
 Hypoaspis pycnosis Karg, 1979
 Hypoaspis qinghaiensis Li-Chao, Yang-Xizheng & Yue-Shanlon, 1997
 Hypoaspis queenslandicus (Womersley, 1956)
 Hypoaspis quinquepara Karg, 2000
 Hypoaspis rarosae (Rosario, 1981)
 Hypoaspis relictovi Senotrusova, 1982
 Hypoaspis reticulatus Xu & Liang, 1996
 Hypoaspis rhizotrogi Masan, 1998
 Hypoaspis rhopaea (Womersley, 1956)
 Hypoaspis rigensis Lapina, 1976
 Hypoaspis rosei Strong & Halliday, 1994
 Hypoaspis ruggi Strong & Halliday, 1994
 Hypoaspis saana Huhta & Karg, 2010
 Hypoaspis sardous (Berlese, 1911)
 Hypoaspis schusteri (Hirschmann, 1966)
 Hypoaspis seriopilosa Karg, 1978
 Hypoaspis serpentis Karg, 1979
 Hypoaspis serrata Karg, 1979
 Hypoaspis shenyangensis Bei, Shi & Yin, 2003
 Hypoaspis similisetae Karg, 1965
 Hypoaspis simplex (Berlese, 1920)
 Hypoaspis simplexans (Womersley, 1956)
 Hypoaspis sinensis (Bai & Gu, 1993)
 Hypoaspis solimani Nawar, Shereef & Ahmed, 1993
 Hypoaspis sorecis Li, Zheng & Yang, 1996
 Hypoaspis spinacrassus Rosario, 1981
 Hypoaspis spinaperaffinis Ma & Cui, in Ma, Liu & Cui 2002
 Hypoaspis spiniseta Barilo, in Barylo 1991
 Hypoaspis stilosus (Canestrini, 1884)
 Hypoaspis subminor Gu & Bai, 1991
 Hypoaspis submontana Bai, Chen & Gu, 1994
 Hypoaspis subpictus Gu & Bai, 1992
 Hypoaspis sungaris Ma, 1996
 Hypoaspis surenai Joharchi & Shahedi, 2016
 Hypoaspis surigaoensis Rosario, 1981
 Hypoaspis tengi Gu & Bai, 1991
 Hypoaspis tenuisetus (Rosario, 1981)
 Hypoaspis terrestris Leonardi, 1899
 Hypoaspis terrestrisimilis Ma, Zhang & Li, 2003
 Hypoaspis tetraspinae Karg, 1995
 Hypoaspis thysanifer (Zeman, 1982)
 Hypoaspis transversanalis Karg, 2000
 Hypoaspis tribina Karg, 1979
 Hypoaspis tridentata Karg, 1979
 Hypoaspis tridentifera Karg, 1978
 Hypoaspis tripodiger Berlese, 1916
 Hypoaspis trispinosa Berlese, 1920
 Hypoaspis tuberculata Masan, 1992
 Hypoaspis ungeri Karg, 1985
 Hypoaspis vacuus (Michael, 1891)
 Hypoaspis vanmoli Loots, 1980
 Hypoaspis verticis Karg, 1978
 Hypoaspis vertisimilis Karg, 1994
 Hypoaspis wangae (Bai & Gu, 1993)
 Hypoaspis weni Bai, Chen & Gu, 1994
 Hypoaspis womersleyi Domrow, 1957
 Hypoaspis wufengensis Liu & Ma, 2003
 Hypoaspis xiajiangensis (Liu & Ma, 2000)
 Hypoaspis yamanchii Ishikawa, 1982
 Hypoaspis yeruiyuae (Ma, 1995)
 Hypoaspis zhongweiensis (Bai & Gu, 1993)
 Hypoaspis zhoumanshuae Ma-Liming, 1997

References

External links

Laelapidae